The 2013 ACB Playoffs was the final phase of the 2012–13 ACB season. It started on May 23 and ended on June 19. FC Barcelona Regal were the defending champions, and Real Madrid took the 2013 title.

All times are CEST (UTC+02:00).

Bracket

Quarterfinals
The quarterfinals are best-of-3 series.

Real Madrid vs. Blu:sens Monbús

Valencia Basket vs. CAI Zaragoza

Laboral Kutxa vs. Herbalife Gran Canaria

FC Barcelona Regal vs. Uxúe Bilbao Basket

Semifinals
The semifinals are best-of-5 series.

Real Madrid vs. CAI Zaragoza

FC Barcelona Regal vs. Herbalife Gran Canaria

Finals
The finals are best-of-5 series.

Real Madrid vs. FC Barcelona Regal

ACB Finals MVP:  Felipe Reyes

References

Liga ACB playoffs
Playoffs